Coominglah Forest is a rural locality in the North Burnett Region, Queensland, Australia.

Geography 
Except for one small valley in the east of the locality using for grazing on native vegetation, the entire locality is within the Coominglah State Forest.

Coominglah Range is in the north of the locality.

The Burnett Highway passes through the locality from the north-east (Moonford) to the north-west (Coominglah).

History 

References 

North Burnett Region
Localities in Queensland